Alexandros "Alex" Konstantinou (born 11 April 1992) is a Cypriot–English professional footballer who plays as a winger for Karmiotissa.

Career

Northampton Town
Konstantinou was a regular scorer for the Northampton Town youth team, before being handed a squad number in February 2010. Konstantinou, along with Paul Walker and Michael Jacobs, were awarded professional contracts for the 2010-11 season. He made his professional debut in the League Cup against Reading on 24 August 2010 setting up a 120+5 min equaliser.

Alex played one match for Woburn F.C. in the Bedfordshire County Football League Premier Division against Sharnbrook F.C. on Saturday, 1 October 2011. The match finished 3-2 to Sharnbrook F.C. In November 2011, he went on a three-week trial at Walsall followed by a further trial at King's Lynn Town FC.

Apollon Limassol
In August 2012, he signed a two-year contract with the Cypriot First Division side Apollon Limassol. During his two-year spell with the club, he managed to win the 2012–13 Cypriot Cup, his first career title. He competed in 35 league matches without scoring any goal. He also appeared in two qualifying and five group stage matches of the 2013–14 UEFA Europa League.

APOEL
On 3 June 2014, Konstantinou signed a three-year contract with APOEL. He made his official debut on 14 January 2015, playing the full 90 minutes in APOEL's 1–0 away victory against Olympiakos Nicosia for the Cypriot Cup. In his first season at APOEL, Alex appeared only in three matches in all competitions, but he managed to win the double, as his team won both the Cypriot championship and the cup.

On 25 June 2015, Alex joined Doxa Katokopias on a season-long loan deal from APOEL. On 3 June 2016, his contract with APOEL was mutually terminated.

International career
He is also a Cypriot youth international.  He debuted in the Cyprus U19 team on 20 September 2010, in a friendly game against Romania where he scored a goal as well. On 5 September 2013, he made his debut for Cyprus U21 team in a UEFA Under-21 qualification match against Serbia.

Personal info
His father Kostakis Konstantinou, like his son, played football in England and for Apollon Limassol. He was capped 35 times by Cyprus.

Honours
Apollon Limassol
Cypriot Cup (1) : 2012–13

APOEL
Cypriot First Division (1): 2014–15
Cypriot Cup (1): 2014–15

References

External links
APOEL official profile

1992 births
Living people
Sportspeople from Nicosia
Greek Cypriot people
Cypriot footballers
Association football forwards
Northampton Town F.C. players
Apollon Limassol FC players
APOEL FC players
Doxa Katokopias FC players
Cypriot First Division players
Cypriot expatriate footballers
Cypriot expatriates in the United Kingdom
Expatriate footballers in England
Olympiakos Nicosia players